Miss USA 1963 was the 12th Miss USA pageant, held in Miami Beach, Florida on July 17, 1963. The pageant was won by Marite Ozers of Illinois, who was crowned by outgoing titleholder Macel Leilani Wilson of Hawaii.  Latvian-born Ozers was the first woman born outside the U.S. to take the Miss USA title, and the second delegate from Illinois to do so.  Ozers went on to finish as a Top 15 semi-finalist at Miss Universe 1963. This was the first Miss USA to be broadcast on television, first aired on CBS that would be remained in the next 39 years.

First runner-up Michele Metrinko later won the Miss World USA 1963 pageant and finished as a Top 14 semi-finalist at Miss World 1963.  Metrinko's sister Marsha also competed in Miss USA 1963 – the only instance to date of two sisters competing against each other at the same pageant.

Results

Historical significance 
 Illinois wins competition for the second time. 
 District of Columbia earns the 1st runner-up position for the first time.
 Missouri earns the 2nd runner-up position for the second time. The last time it placed this was in 1952.
 Colorado earns the 3rd runner-up position for the first time.
 California earns the 4th runner-up position for the first time.
 States that placed in semifinals the previous year were Arizona, California, Colorado, District of Columbia, Illinois, Nevada, New York and Tennessee.
 California and New York placed for the seventh consecutive year. 
 Nevada placed for the third consecutive year. 
 Arizona, Colorado, District of Columbia, Illinois and Tennessee made their second consecutive placement.
 Alabama, Massachusetts, Michigan last placed in 1961.
 Missouri last placed in 1960.
 South Carolina last placed in 1958.
 New Mexico last placed in 1955.
 Oklahoma last placed in 1952.
 Connecticut and Utah break an ongoing streak of placements since 1960.

Delegates
The Miss USA 1963 delegates were:

 Alabama - Dinah Armstrong
 Alaska - Nina Whaley
 Arizona - Diane McGarry
 Arkansas - Cheryl Bechtelheimer
 California - Francine Herack
 Colorado - Rhea Looney
 Connecticut - Gail Dinan
 Delaware - Susan Kowalski
 District of Columbia - Michele Metrinko
 Florida - Linda Egland
 Georgia - Brenda Seagraves
 Hawaii - Susan Molina
 Illinois - Marite Ozers
 Indiana - Vickie Little
 Iowa - Ramona Meylor
 Kansas - Diane Stalker
 Kentucky - Mary Arnold
 Louisiana - Peggy Romero
 Maine - Laurel Barker
 Maryland - Marsha Metrinko
 Massachusetts - Sandra Smith
 Michigan - Pamela Sands
 Mississippi - Joan Kinnebrew
 Missouri - Sandra Marlin
 Nebraska - Sandy Zimmer
 Nevada - Kathee Francis
 New Hampshire - Johnnye McLeod
 New Jersey - Judy Ayers
 New Mexico - Sandra Fullingim
 New York - Jeanne Quinn
 North Carolina - Trudy Cauthen
 Ohio - Gloria McBride
 Oklahoma - Roberta Mosier
 Oregon - Joset Fisher
 Pennsylvania - Deborah Cardonick
 Rhode Island - Rosemary Dickinson
 South Carolina - Cecelia Yoder
 Tennessee - Bobbie Morrow
 Texas - Cheryl Wilburn
 Utah - Carla Dinius
 Vermont - Ellen Centerbar
 West Virginia - Nina Denton
 Wisconsin - Lynn Korchunoff

No state delegate: Idaho, Minnesota, Montana, North Dakota, South Dakota, Virginia, Washington, Wyoming

External links 
 

1963
1963 in the United States
1963 beauty pageants